The 2013–14 Central Arkansas Sugar Bears basketball team represented the University of Central Arkansas during the 2013–14 NCAA Division I women's basketball season. The Bears were led by second year head coach Sandra Rushing and play their home games at the Farris Center. They are members of the Southland Conference.

Roster

Schedule

|-
!colspan=9| Regular Season

|-
!colspan=9| 2014 Southland Conference women's basketball tournament

See also
 2013–14 Central Arkansas Bears basketball team

References

Central Arkansas Sugar Bears basketball seasons
Central Arkansas
2013 in sports in Arkansas
2014 in sports in Arkansas